The Colombia Open (currently sponsored by Claro and called the Claro Open Colombia) was a professional men's tennis tournament played on outdoor hard courts in Bogotá, Colombia. The event is affiliated with the Association of Tennis Professionals (ATP), and is a 250 series tournament on the ATP World Tour.  The tournament replaced the Los Angeles Open on the ATP World Tour starting in 2013.

IMLA de Colombia bought the rights of the Los Angeles Open in 2013 and transferred the tournament to the city of Bogotá.

The Colombia Open was the fifth tournament affiliated with the ATP held in Latin America, after the tournaments in Viña del Mar (Chile), São Paulo (Brazil), Acapulco (Mexico) and Buenos Aires (Argentina). It is also the tournament with the most prize money in South America, with a total of $727,000. The Colombia Open was replaced in 2016 calendar by the Los Cabos Open, in Mexico. Currently in 2019 tournaments in Latin America are Córdoba, Buenos Aires, Rio, São Paulo, Acapulco, all during February, and Los Cabos in July.

The tournament, played on a hard surface, took place during the second week of July, before the start of the North American swing and the US Open.

In a first edition that boasted the likes of the Serbian Janko Tipsarević and the South African Kevin Anderson, the Croatian Ivo Karlović was the surprise package, claiming the title after defeating the Colombian Alejandro Falla in the final. Karlovic's victory was his fifth ATP title and his first since 2008.

In doubles, the Indian couple formed by Purav Raja and Divij Sharan defeated the Dutch Igor Sijsling and the French Édouard Roger-Vasselin claiming their first-ever ATP trophy.

Results

Singles

Doubles

Statistics

Championships by player

Championships by country

References

External links 
 
 ATP World Tour website

 
ATP Tour 250
Defunct tennis tournaments in Colombia
Tennis tournaments in Colombia
Hard court tennis tournaments
Recurring sporting events established in 2013
Recurring sporting events disestablished in 2015